Nesoleontini is a tribe in the antlion subfamily Myrmecaelurinae.

Genera 
 Cueta
 Nadus
 Nesoleon

References

External links 

Myrmeleontidae
Insect tribes